Yelwala or Ilvaala is a Census town in the city of Mysore in Karnataka state, India. This place is located between Mysore and Hunsur. Yelwala is a hobli headquarter and a Gram Panchayat. The population of Yelwala in census 2011 was 9,826.

Location
Yelwala is located on Mysuru-Mangalore Highway near the city of Hootagalli, Mysuru. It is semi urbanised and is connected well with the city.

Demographics 
The town has population of 9,826 of which 4,940 are males while 4,886 are females. Population of Children with age of 0-6 is 1104 which is 11.24 % of total population of Elwala (CT). In Elwala Census Town, Female Sex Ratio is of 989 against state average of 973. Moreover Child Sex Ratio in Elwala is around 971 compared to Karnataka state average of 948. Literacy rate of Elwala city is 75.54 % higher than state average of 75.36 %. In Elwala, Male literacy is around 82.65 % while female literacy rate is 68.38 %.

Landmarks 

 Aloka Palace
 Aloka Tree Park
 St. Joseph Central School
 Sri Ramakrishna Mission
 Brahmakumaris
 Power Grid Corporation 
 Yelwala Satellite Bus Stand
 Bhabha Atomic Research Centre
 Atomic Energy Central School
 Yelwala Lake
 KRS Nisarga Badavane

Transport 
Yelwala has a satellite bus stand that serves buses to Mysore City bus stand via Hootagalli. Nearest railway station is Mysore. Nearest Airport is Mysore Airport. NH275 Connecting Bangalore and Mangalore via Mysore passes through Yelwala. Yelwala-Shrirangapatna Road is another important road.

Gallery

References

Suburbs of Mysore
Mysore North